Jon Eardley (September 30, 1928 – April 1, 1991) was an American jazz trumpeter.

Life and career
Born in Altoona, Pennsylvania, Eardley first started on trumpet at the age of 11; his father played in Paul Whiteman's orchestra. From 1946 to 1949 Eardley played in an Air Force band in Washington, D.C., then led with his own quartet in D.C. from 1950 to 1953.

He moved to New York City in 1953, playing with Phil Woods (1954), Gerry Mulligan (1954–57), and Hal McIntyre (1956). Following this he returned to his hometown and played there until 1963, when he moved to Belgium. The last years before death he played in the WDR Big Band Cologne, Germany. He died in Lambermont, near Verviers, Belgium.

Discography

As leader
 The Jon Eardley Seven (Prestige, 1956)
 Two of a Kind with Mick Pyne (Spotlite, 1977)
 Namely Me (Spotlite, 1979)
 Stablemates with Al Haig (Spotlite, 1979)

As sideman
With Gerry Mulligan
 California Concerts (Pacific Jazz, 1955)
 Presenting the Gerry Mulligan Sextet (EmArcy, 1955)
 Mainstream of Jazz (EmArcy, 1956)
 A Profile of Gerry Mulligan (Mercury, 1959)

With others
 Teo Macero, What's New? (Columbia, 1956)
 J. R. Monterose, Body and Soul (Munich, 1970)
 Airto Moreira, Misa Espiritual: Airto's Brazilian Mass (Harmonia Mundi, 1983)
 Charlie Parker, Apartment Jam Sessions (Zim, 1977)
 Manfred Schoof, Reflections (Mood, 1984)
 Zoot Sims, Choice (Pacific Jazz, 1961)

References

1928 births
1991 deaths
American jazz trumpeters
American male trumpeters
West Coast jazz trumpeters
Cool jazz trumpeters
Bebop trumpeters
American jazz flugelhornists
Jazz musicians from Pennsylvania
Prestige Records artists
20th-century American musicians
20th-century trumpeters
20th-century American male musicians
American male jazz musicians